Kappur is a village and gram panchayat in Palakkad district, Kerala, India.

Demographics 
 India census, Kappur had a population of 28,349 with 11,532 males and 14,817 females.

References 

Villages in Palakkad district
Gram panchayats in Palakkad district